Luvsangiin Erkhemjamts (born 18 January 1943) is a former Mongolian cyclist. He competed in the individual road race and team time trial events at the 1964 Summer Olympics.

References

External links
 

1943 births
Living people
Mongolian male cyclists
Olympic cyclists of Mongolia
Cyclists at the 1964 Summer Olympics
Place of birth missing (living people)
20th-century Mongolian people